Sisyra apicalis is a species of spongillafly in the family Sisyridae. It is found in the Caribbean Sea, Central America, North America, and South America.

References

Further reading

 
 

Hemerobiiformia
Articles created by Qbugbot
Insects described in 1908